The 2012 Amputee Football World Cup, aka 2012 Amputee Soccer World Cup, was the 13th edition of the biannual international competition of amputee football national men's teams. It was organized by the World Amputee Football Federation (WAFF), and was held in Kaliningrad, Russia between 7 and 14 October 2012. The previous event took place in Argentina in 2010. Mexico was selected by majority vote on the WAFF 2012 Congress to host the next World Cup in 2014.

The competition was originally planned to be held in Japan. However, the venue was changed due to the April 2011 Fukushima earthquake.

Uzbekistan won the title for the three consecutive time, defeating the sixth-time champions Russia in the final. Turkey became bronze medalist before Argentina.

Participating nations
The original line-up of the competition changed as France and Brazil withdrew, and in their places Poland and Ukraine joined the 2012 World Cup.

Following twelve nations, including Uzbekistan as the defending world champion, competed in two divisions. The first two ranking teams in each division qualified for the semi finals.

Preliminary round

Division A

Division B

Placement matches

Finals

Rankings

References

Amputee Football World Cup
International association football competitions hosted by Russia
Amputee
Sport in Kaliningrad
2012 in disability sport
Amputee